Elachista asperae is a moth of the family Elachistidae. It is found along the coast of New South Wales, Australia.

The wingspan is 8.8-9.2 mm for males and 10.3 mm for females. The forewings are pale grey. The hindwings are grey.

The larvae feed on Gahnia aspera. They mine the leaves of their host plant. The mine may be found in any part of the leaf. It is broad and irregularly shaped and reaches a length of about 100 mm. Pupation takes place outside of the mine.

References

Moths described in 2011
asperae
Moths of Australia
Taxa named by Lauri Kaila